The three most common types of Chinese polearms are the ge (戈), qiang (槍), and ji (戟). They are translated into English as dagger-axe, spear, and halberd. Dagger-axes were originally a short slashing weapon with a 0.9 to 1.8 m long shaft, but around the 4th century BC a spearhead was added to the blade, and it became a halberd. The spear is also sometimes called a mao (矛), which is sometimes used to designate polearms with a wavy snake-like spearhead. There was another polearm weapon known as the pi (鈹), translated into English as either sword-staff or long lance, that was used from ancient times until the Han dynasty. It was essentially a short sword attached to a stick. From the Warring States period onward, the length of Chinese polearms varied from around 2.8 m to 5.5 m, however there is no specific designation for a pike in the traditional Chinese lexicon. A very long spear is just called a long spear.

Shang dynasty (c. 1600 BC–c. 1046 BC)

Early handheld weapons included the dagger-axe, a bronze blade mounted at right angles to a 0.9 to 1.8 m long shaft, and bronze spears roughly 2.1 m in length. The dagger-axe was the first Chinese weapon designed to kill other people. Battles were fought in open formation to allow for the swinging of dagger-axes.

Spring and Autumn period (771–476 BC)

By the late Spring and Autumn period, jians lengthened to about 56 cm. At this point at least some soldiers used the jian rather than the dagger-axe due to its greater flexibility and portability.

China started producing steel in the 6th century BC, but it was not until later on that iron and steel implements were produced in useful amounts. By around 500 BC however the sword and shield combination began to be regarded as superior to the spear and dagger-axe.

Warring States period (475–221 BC)

By the end of the 4th century BC, dagger-axes with spearheads began to appear, essentially becoming a halberd. Spears and halberds came in two general sizes. One about 2.8 m long and the other around 5.5m, or what would be considered a pike in western terminology. According to Wu Qi, tall men were given bows and arrows while short men spears and halberds.

Han dynasty (206 BC–220 AD)

The jian was mentioned as one of the "Five Weapons" during the Han dynasty, the other four being dao, spear, halberd, and staff. Another version of the Five Weapons lists the bow and crossbow as one weapon, the jian and dao as one weapon, in addition to halberd, shield, and armour.

During the Battle of Zhizhi in 36 BC, the Chinese deployed their troops in three sections, with men carrying 'great shields' in front, spearmen behind them, and crossbowmen in the rear.

An account of Duan Jiong's tactical formation in 167 AD specifies that he arranged "…three ranks of halberds (長鏃 changzu), swordsmen (利刃 liren) and spearmen (長矛 changmao), supported by crossbows (強弩 qiangnu), with light cavalry (輕騎 jingji) on each wing."

Three Kingdoms (184/220–280)

Halberds became less common during the Three Kingdoms period due to its weight in comparison to the spear. However idiosyncratic weapons such as double ended halberds, one handed halberds, or paired halberds are mentioned to have been used by noteworthy warriors in their biographies.

Spear throwing was uncommon among Chinese troops, but was practiced by tribesmen in northwestern China during the 3rd and 4th centuries.

Tang dynasty (618–907)

According to Tang texts, spearmen were all supposed to carry a bow and crossbowmen to be armed with halberds for self-defense, but it's not clear how well this worked in practice.

Song dynasty (960–1279)

Song texts recommend using both mixed and non-mixed units. The practice of deploying crossbowmen in combination with shields and spears was common, but the Wujing Zongyao recommends that crossbowmen make up their own units and defeat enemies through firepower alone. Spears were also combined with gunpowder tubes to create the fire lance.

Ming dynasty (1368–1644)

Qi Jiguang deployed his soldiers in a 12-man 'mandarin duck' formation, which consisted of four pikemen, two men carrying daos with a great and small shield, two 'wolf brush' wielders, a rearguard officer, and a porter. A rearguard of two men with three-pronged fire-lances [later replaced by musketeers], an officer, and a porter, completed the squad. This arrangement may seem rather inefficient, with only one man in three actually equipped for offensive action, but in the context of Qi's isolated command, with plenty of peasant manpower available but no capacity for manufacturing sophisticated weapons, it was no doubt a logical approach.

See also
 Chinese armour
 Chinese siege weapons

References

Bibliography
.

 

 

 Late Imperial Chinese Armies: 1520-1840 C.J. Peers, Illustrated by Christa Hook, Osprey Publishing «Men-at-arms», 

Polearms
Chinese melee weapons